Captain James Joseph Bernard Jackman VC (19 March 1916 – 26 November 1941) was an Irish posthumous recipient of the Victoria Cross, the highest and most prestigious award for gallantry in the face of an enemy that can be awarded to British and Commonwealth forces.

Details
Jackman was 25 years old, and a captain commanding Z Company of the 1st Battalion, Royal Northumberland Fusiliers, part of the 70th Division, during the Second World War when the following deed took place during Operation Crusader for which he was awarded the VC. His citation in the London Gazette reads:

The medal
Jackman's Cross found its final home at his alma mater, Stonyhurst College, on permanent loan from his late sister's family.

References

Listed in order of publication year 
The Register of the Victoria Cross (1981, 1988 and 1997)

Ireland's VCs  (Dept of Economic Development, 1995)
Monuments to Courage (David Harvey, 1999)
Irish Winners of the Victoria Cross (Richard Doherty & David Truesdale, 2000)

External links
Captain J.B. Jackman in The Art of War exhibition at the UK National Archives

1916 births
1941 deaths
Royal Northumberland Fusiliers officers
People educated at Stonyhurst College
Irish World War II recipients of the Victoria Cross
British Army personnel killed in World War II
Irish officers in the British Army
British Army recipients of the Victoria Cross
People from County Dublin
Military personnel from Dublin (city)